Vaziri (also Romanized as Vazīrī) is a village in Berentin Rural District, Bikah District, Rudan County, Hormozgan Province, Iran. At the 2006 census, its population was 432, in 89 families.

References 

Populated places in Rudan County